Paul Legault (born June 25, 1985) is a Canadian-American poet.

Life
Legault was born in Ottawa, Ontario, and raised in Tennessee. He graduated from the University of Southern California, where he obtained a BFA in screenwriting, and the University of Virginia, where he earned an MFA in creative writing.

He is a co-founder of the translation press Telephone Books. Since 2010, his output has taken on characteristics similar to Kenneth Koch works such as One Thousand Avant-Garde Plays, with absurdist miniature dialogues between animate, inanimate, or abstract characters. In 2012, he released terse English-to-English translations of Emily Dickinson's poetry.

His writing has been published in The Awl, Boston Review, Denver Quarterly, Field, The Literati Quarterly, Pleiades and other journals.

From 2013 to 2015, he lived in St. Louis, Missouri, serving as a writer-in-residence at Washington University in St. Louis. Currently, he lives in New York City.

Bibliography

Collections
The Tower (Coach House Books, 2020). 
Lunch Poems 2 (Spork, 2018). 
Self-Portrait in a Convex Mirror 2 (Fence, 2016). 
The Emily Dickinson Reader: An English-to-English Translation of the Complete Poems of Emily Dickinson (McSweeney's, 2012). 
The Other Poems (Fence, 2011). 
The Madeleine Poems (Omnidawn, 2010).

Edited anthology
The Sonnets: Translating and Rewriting Shakespeare (Nightboat/Telephone, 2012).

References

External links
 "Author's site"
 "An Interview with Paul Legault", BOMB, 15. Dec, 2010
 "Telephone" 

1985 births
Living people
American male poets
American LGBT poets
Canadian male poets
Canadian translators
Franco-Ontarian people
Canadian gay writers
Canadian LGBT poets
Poets from Tennessee
University of Virginia alumni
Writers from Ottawa
21st-century American male writers
21st-century American poets
21st-century Canadian male writers
21st-century Canadian poets
21st-century American translators
Washington University in St. Louis faculty
University of Southern California alumni
Gay poets
American gay writers
21st-century Canadian LGBT people